Tarand-e Pain (also Romanized as Ţārand-e Pā’īn; also known as Ţārand-e Soflá) is a village in Tarand Rural District, Jalilabad District, Pishva County, Tehran Province, Iran. At the 2006 census, its population was 847, in 188 families.

References 

Populated places in Pishva County